Richard Talens is an entrepreneur and fitness coach. He is the founder of Fitocracy, an online game and social network with over 10 million users. According to The Economist, Talens came up with the idea of Fitocracy from his past as a geek who played MMORPGs. He was named one of the world's most influential people in health & fitness by Greatist in 2014.

Career
Besides being an entrepreneur, Richard also speaks and writes about his experience as a fitness coach and a growth hacker.

Richard was Mallory Hagan's fitness coach on her road to becoming Miss America 2013. Richard is also a regular fitness contributor for popular outlets like Lifehacker and Thrillist and has spoken about his fitness experience through TEDx.

Richard also writes about his extensive experience scaling companies as a growth marketer.

Education
Talens has a B.S. in Managing E-Commerce from the Wharton School at the University of Pennsylvania.

References

External links
"How I Got Ripped At 500 Startups" by Dick Talens

1988 births
Living people
Businesspeople from New Orleans
Fitness and figure competitors
People from Clinton Hill, Brooklyn